Pareiorhaphis is a genus of catfish in the family Loricariidae native to South America. This genus can be readily distinguished from other neoplecostomines by the unique combination of having fleshy lobes on lateral margins of head ornamented with hypertrophied odontodes on nuptial males, caudal peduncle ovoid in cross section, abdomen usually naked, dorsal fin spinelet ovoid and adipose fin usually present. The color pattern is usually dark brown and mottled with the abdomen white. Most species in to Pareiorhaphis were originally described in Hemipsilichthys. In 1918, Alípio de Miranda-Ribeiro proposed the new genus Pareiorhaphis. Whether Pareiorhaphis is monophyletic or not is currently unknown.

Species
There are currently 25 recognized species in this genus: 
 Pareiorhaphis azygolechis (E. H. L. Pereira & R. E. dos Reis, 2002)
 Pareiorhaphis bahianus (Gosline, 1947)
 Pareiorhaphis cameroni (Steindachner, 1907)
 Pareiorhaphis cerosus (P. Miranda-Ribeiro, 1951)
 Pareiorhaphis eurycephalus (E. H. L. Pereira & R. E. dos Reis, 2002)
 Pareiorhaphis garapia E. H. L. Pereira, Lehmann A., Schvambach & R. E. dos Reis, 2015 
 Pareiorhaphis garbei (R. Ihering (pt), 1911)
 Pareiorhaphis hypselurus (E. H. L. Pereira & R. E. dos Reis, 2002)
 Pareiorhaphis hystrix (E. H. L. Pereira & R. E. dos Reis, 2002)
 Pareiorhaphis lophia E. H. L. Pereira & Zanata, 2014 
 Pareiorhaphis mutuca (J. C. de Oliveira & Oyakawa, 1999)
 Pareiorhaphis nasuta E. H. L. Pereira, F. Vieira & R. E. dos Reis, 2007
 Pareiorhaphis nudulus (R. E. dos Reis & E. H. L. Pereira, 1999)
 Pareiorhaphis parmula E. H. L. Pereira, 2005
 Pareiorhaphis proskynita E. H. L. Pereira & M. R. Britto, 2012 
 Pareiorhaphis regani (Giltay, 1936)
 Pareiorhaphis ruschii E. H. L. Pereira, Lehmann A. & R. E. dos Reis, 2012 
 Pareiorhaphis scutula E. H. L. Pereira, F. Vieira & R. E. dos Reis, 2010
 Pareiorhaphis splendens (Bizerril, 1995)
 Pareiorhaphis steindachneri (A. Miranda-Ribeiro, 1918)
 Pareiorhaphis stephanus (J. C. de Oliveira & Oyakawa, 1999)
 Pareiorhaphis stomias (E. H. L. Pereira & R. E. dos Reis, 2002)
 Pareiorhaphis togoroi Oliveira & Oyakawa, 2019 
 Pareiorhaphis vestigipinnis (E. H. L. Pereira & R. E. dos Reis, 1992)
 Pareiorhaphis vetula E. H. L. Pereira, Lehmann A. & R. E. dos Reis, 2016

References

Loricariidae
Fish of South America
Catfish genera
Taxa named by Alípio de Miranda-Ribeiro
Freshwater fish genera